Mkwakwani Stadium is a multi-purpose stadium in Tanga, Tanzania. It is used mostly for football matches, being the home venue for Coastal Union F.C., African Sports, and JKT Mgambo. It has a seating capacity of 15,000 people.

See also
List of stadiums in Tanzania

References

Football venues in Tanzania
Buildings and structures in Tanga, Tanzania
Chama Cha Mapinduzi